The 2004 Rally of Turkey (formally the 5th Rally of Turkey) was the seventh round of the 2004 World Rally Championship. The race was held over four days between 24 June and 27 June 2004, and was based in Antalya, Turkey. Citroën's Sébastien Loeb won the race, his 8th win in the World Rally Championship.

Background

Entry list

Itinerary
All dates and times are EEST (UTC+3).

Results

Overall

World Rally Cars

Classification

Special stages

Championship standings

Junior World Rally Championship

Classification

Special stages

Championship standings

References

External links 
 Official website of the World Rally Championship

Turkey
Rally
Rally of Turkey
June 2004 sports events in Turkey